Mosunmola Abudu, also known as Mo Abudu, (born 11 September 1964), is a Nigerian media mogul, philanthropist, and former human resources management consultant. She has been described by Forbes as "Africa's Most Successful Woman", and rated as one of the "25 Most Powerful Women in Global Television" by The Hollywood Reporter.

Biography

Early life 
Mo Abudu was born in Hammersmith, West London. Her father was an engineer and her mother was a caterer. Her family roots are in Ondo Town, southwest Nigeria. She is the eldest of the three sisters in the family. Mosunmola Abudu moved to Nigeria when she was 7 years old to live with her grandparents, and returned to England at the age of 11.

Education 
She attended the Ridgeway School, MidKent College, and West Kent College. She has a Master's Degree in Human Resource Management from the University of Westminster in London. Abudu is currently a member of the British Psychological Society with qualifications in occupational and personality testing.

In 2014, she received an honorary Doctor of Humane Letters (Honouris Causa) from Babcock University. Abudu was awarded by the University of Westminster with an honorary doctorate degree of Doctor of Arts in 2018 in recognition of her contributions to the broadcasting industry in Nigeria.

Career
At the age 19, Mo Abudu was selected to be the brand ambassador for AVON Cosmetics for the African market.

Abudu started her professional career as a recruitment consultant in 1987 with the Atlas Recruitment Consultancy firm in the UK, from where she moved to Starform Group in 1990. She returned to Nigeria in 1993 and was head-hunted by Arthur Andersen to head the Human Resources and Training for oil giant, ExxonMobil. She is the founder of Vic Lawrence & Associates Limited. She went on to create, produce and present Moments with Mo, later founded a television station (Ebony Life Television) and has been producing entertainment contents to date.

Ebony Life TV & Film
Abudu started Ebonylife TV (ELTV) in 2006, a network airing in many countries across Africa, as well as in the UK and the Caribbean to a pan-African audience. EbonyLife TV transmitted its first broadcast on 1 July 2013 on Multichoice's DSTV Channel 165. Less than a year into operations and ranking among the top 25% of most watched channels on the DStv platform, EbonyLife TV launched a multi-screen video-on-demand (VOD) platform targeting Africans in the diaspora. It expanded its Sub Sahara African reach, following a carriage deal with another pay-TV operator StarTimes. Notable among TV drama series executive-produced and/or produced by Abudu, and aired on ELTV, include: Desperate Housewives Africa in partnership with Disney, Sons Of The Caliphate, Castle & Castle, On the Real and The Governor.

Abudu established EbonyLife Films in 2014. Her first film as an executive producer was Fifty (film). Teaming up with The ELFIKE Collective in 2016, she produced The Wedding Party,. The film became the highest-grossing title of all time in the Nigerian film industry (Nollywood). Other films she has also executive-produced or co-produced are: The Wedding Party 2, The Royal Hibiscus Hotel, Chief Daddy, Your Excellency (film) and Òlòtūré, "the story of a young, naïve Nigerian journalist who goes undercover to expose the shady underworld of human trafficking." Òlòtūré's private screening was co-hosted with the Creative Artists Agency (CAA) at CAA's Los Angeles headquarters in June 2019.

In March 2018, Sony Pictures Television (SPT) announced that they had concluded a three-year deal with EbonyLife TV that would include co-production of The Dahomey Warriors, a series about the Amazons who took on French colonialists in a 19th-century west African kingdom.
She was announced as the chair of the 47th international Emmy Awards gala that took place in New York on 25 November 2019.

In January 2020, AMC Networks (USA) announced its partnership with EbonyLife to produce Nigeria 2099, an afrofuturistic crime-drama created by EbonyLife.

In February 2020, a new partnership between EbonyLife TV and Netflix was announced. The streaming giant acquired EbonyLife's drama series: Castle & Castle, Fifty, Sons of the Caliphate, On the Real, and The Governor, along with a reality show, The Dating Game and feature film, The Royal Hibiscus Hotel.

Netflix signed a new deal with EbonyLife in June 2020. According to the deal, she is to work with the teams at Netflix to create two original series as well as multiple Netflix-branded films.  Among the highlights will be a film adaptation of Death and the King’s Horseman, a play by Nobel Prize winner Wole Soyinka, and a series based on Lola Shoneyin’s best-selling debut novel, The Secret Lives of Baba Segi’s Wives.

In December 2019, Mo Abudu opened Ebonylife Place, a lifestyle and entertainment resort located on Victoria Island, Lagos. On 12 June 2020, Mo Abudu partnered with U.S.-based streaming company Netflix to create two new TV series and several films. On 4 February 2021, she signed Nigeria's first look deal, The deal expands on a partnership struck with Sony in 2018 and adds to a multi-title deal the company has with Netflix. On 17 February 2021, it was announced that Ebony Life partners with Will Smith and Jada Pinkett Smith's Westbrook Studios to produce a slate of film and television projects each connected to the African continent.

In September 2020, Netflix launched a movie titled 'Oloture', a story by Mo Abudu which was a powerful art-nouneau-style movie. The movie was shot in Lagos and mainly centred around human trafficking in Nigeria. Talking about the movie, she said "Òlòtūré explores a world very few people know anything about, and that had to be dealt with in a particular way," she added "It’s not a documentary, but it addresses real issues most of our society doesn’t see, harnessing the talents of some of the country’s top actors and filmmakers to produce a film that is both intelligent and profound – and breaks bold new genre and stylistic ground for Nollywood."

EbonyLife Place was launched by Mo Abudu in the month of December 2019. It is Nigeria's first lifestyle and entertainment resort. It boosts unique features like EbonyLife Place, EbonyLife Cinemas, The White Orchid Hotel, Jinja, Túraká rooftop restaurant & bar, Jinja Garden & Poolside, The Victoria Hall, and The VVIP Lounges. It is situated on Victoria Island, Lagos. In 2021, the Lagos State Ministry of Arts, Culture & Tourism hosted EkoDesign, a furniture design and lighting exhibition in conjunction with EbonyLife Place. Mo abudu ebony life media established a partnership with Sony pictures television to set up 'Alo' translated into once upon a time, a writer's initiative for Africans  On 29 November 2021, it was announced that BBC Studios inked a deal with EbonyLife Media for a development deal.

Mo Abudu enters No. 98 of Forbes 100 most powerful women for 2021.

In October 2021, The Hollywood Reporter, named her among the 20 most powerful women in global entertainment.

Filmography 

 The Secret Lives of Baba Segi's Wives (TV Series)
 Untitled Billionaire Gucci Master Project
 Blood Sisters (TV Mini Series 2022)
 Chief Daddy 2: Going for Broke (2022)
 Òlòtūré (2019)
 Chief Daddy (2018)
 Castle & Castle(TV Series 2018)
 The Wedding Party 2: Destination Dubai (2017)
 The Royal Hibiscus Hotel (2017)
 Fifty (TV Series 2017)
 Sons of the Caliphate (TV Series)
 The Wedding Party(2016/II)
 On the Real (TV Series 2016)
 The Governor (TV Series)
 Fifty (2015)
 Desperate Housewives Africa (TV Series 2015)
 Dowry (TV Series 2014)
 Married To The Game - MTTG (TV Series 2014)
 Deadline (TV Series 2014)
 Love and War (TV Movie 2013)

Moments with Mo
Abudu is the Executive Producer and host of a TV talk show, Moments with Mo, which is the first syndicated daily talk show on African regional television.

By October 2009, over 200 episodes had been recorded and aired with topics ranging from lifestyle, through health, culture, politics, entertainment, tradition, to music and inter-racial marriages. Guests have included celebrities, Presidents, Nobel Laureates, and the 67th US Secretary-of-State Hillary Clinton, Abudu says the show "highlights the life and accomplishments of a usually well known, but sometimes an undiscovered African individual who by his or her own tenacity and determination has accomplished something, overcome something or been a catalyst for something that makes her or him a role model to others."

Aired on M-Net with TV coverage in 48 African countries, the show now also airs on terrestrial and cable TV in other parts of the world.

The show's success and intention to change the world's perception of the African continent has led to comparisons to Oprah Winfrey, with The Independent and Slate Afrique calling her "Africa's Oprah" or "Nigerian Winfrey", respectively.

The Debaters
Mo Abudu is the creator and executive producer of The Debaters, a reality television show. Funded by Guaranty Trust Bank, it launched on 3 October 2009. The show focuses on "giving Africa a voice" by promoting oratory.

Honours 
Forbes Africa recognised Abudu as the first African woman to own a Pan-Africa TV channel (2013). She was listed as one of the 25 Most Powerful Women in Global TV by The Hollywood Reporter in 2013 and received the Entrepreneur of the Year award by Women Werk in New York (2014).

Abudu was nominated to serve as a member of the Advisory Group on Technology and Creatively for Nigeria. Abudu was appointed a Director of the International Academy of Television Arts and Sciences, the organization responsible for staging the International Emmy Award. The Academy later appointed her as Chair of the 47th International Emmy Awards Gala, held in New York on Monday 25 November 2019. She was the first African to land the role.

She was named on the Power list 2018, an annual list of the UK's top 100 most influential people of African and Caribbean heritage. Abudu was nominated to serve as a member of the Advisory Group on Technology and Creatively for Nigeria in 2018 as well.

In 2019, she was awarded the MIPTV's 2019 Médailles d'Honneur, in Cannes, France, making her the first African to be a recipient of the reputable award. Later that year, Abudu was announced as being listed in the 2020 Powerlist, listing the Top 100 of the most influential people in the UK of African/African-Caribbean descent. She is featured in the 493-page book, Greatest Blacks Ever: Top 100 Blacks Who Changed the World for Peace. Progress. Prosperity. Pleasure.,  authored by Ambassador Elliston Rahming and published by Dog Ear Publishing

Mo Abudu is set to be awarded the 2019 Médailles d'Honneur in Cannes at the Marche International des Programmes de Television (MIPTV). She is one of the 4 recipients of the award, which she will receive in April 2019. Mo Abudu is represented by the Creative Artists Agency (CAA).

Personal life
Mo Abudu lives in Lagos. She has a son and a daughter. and was formerly married to Tokunbo Abudu.

See also
Amira Elmissiry
Funke Opeke

References

External links

 The Debaters Official Page
 Inspire Africa

1964 births
Living people
People from Hammersmith
Nigerian television personalities
Alumni of the University of Westminster
English people of Nigerian descent
British emigrants to Nigeria
Businesspeople from London
Nigerian television talk show hosts
Black British television personalities
Nigerian motivational speakers
Nigerian philanthropists
Nigerian television company founders
Nigerian women company founders
Television personalities from Lagos
Nigerian management consultants
Women television personalities
21st-century Nigerian businesswomen
21st-century Nigerian businesspeople
Nigerian women film producers
Nigerian film producers
People from Ondo State
Nigerian film directors
People associated with the University of Westminster
Nigerian media personalities
Fellows of the British Psychological Society
Nigerian chief executives
Nigerian humanitarians
Nigerian television producers